Shawn William Windsor (born November 29, 1963) is an American man convicted of killing his estranged wife, Betty Jean Windsor, and son, Corey Windsor, in Louisville, Kentucky in 2003. Windsor appeared on the television show America's Most Wanted twice before viewers provided police with tips that led to his July 2004 capture in Shelby, North Carolina. Windsor was sentenced to death on November 17, 2006, and is currently on death row at the Kentucky State Penitentiary in Eddyville, Kentucky.

References
 America's Most Wanted Casefile
 Death Row Inmates. Kentucky Department of Corrections. Retrieved on 2018-12-09.
 Offender Detail Listing. Kentucky Department of Corrections. Retrieved on 2007-11-25.
 Prosecutors to seek death penalty in two slayings. The Cincinnati Enquirer (2004-09-10). Retrieved on 2007-11-25.
 Kuo, Frances. Shawn Windsor Pleads For Death Penalty For 2003 Murders. WAVE 3 TV (2006-12-26). Retrieved on 2007-11-25.

1963 births
2003 murders in the United States
Living people
American people convicted of murder
Familicides
Place of birth missing (living people)
American prisoners sentenced to death
Crimes in Louisville, Kentucky
Prisoners sentenced to death by Kentucky
Criminals from Kentucky
People convicted of murder by Kentucky